Ireneusz Marcinkowski (born 28 September 1977) is a Polish footballer.

Marcinkowski played 17 games during the 2007–08 Ekstraklasa season for newly promoted Polonia Bytom.

References

External links 
 

1977 births
Living people
Polish footballers
Ekstraklasa players
Association football defenders
Polonia Bytom players
Polonia Słubice players
Place of birth missing (living people)